The Women's time trial of the 2011 UCI Road World Championships cycling event took place on 20 September 2011 in Copenhagen, Denmark.

After three previous silver medals in the event, Germany's Judith Arndt took her first gold medal in the damp conditions, recording a time 21 seconds quicker than any of her rivals. New Zealand's Linda Villumsen improved upon her two previous bronze medals to finish second, and the reigning world champion Emma Pooley completed the podium, 2.4 seconds behind Villumsen.

Route

Final classification

References

External links

Women's time trial
UCI Road World Championships – Women's time trial
2011 in women's road cycling